Cinemax is an American pay television, cable, and satellite television network owned by the Home Box Office, Inc. subsidiary of Warner Bros. Discovery. Developed as a companion "maxi-pay" service complementing the offerings shown on parent network Home Box Office (HBO) and initially focusing on recent and classic films upon its launch on August 1, 1980, programming featured on Cinemax currently consists primarily of recent and older theatrically released motion pictures, and original action series, as well as documentaries and special behind-the-scenes featurettes.

Cinemax—which, in conjunction with HBO, was among the first two American pay television services to offer complementary multiplexed channels in August 1991—operates eight 24-hour, linear multiplex channels; a traditional subscription video on demand platform (Cinemax On Demand); and formerly a TV Everywhere streaming platform for Cinemax's linear television subscribers (Cinemax Go). On digital platforms, the Cinemax linear channels were not accessible on Cinemax Go. in its final years, but are available to subscribers of over-the-top multichannel video programming distributors, and as live streams included in a la carte subscription channels sold through Apple TV Channels, Amazon Video Channels and Roku, which primarily feature VOD library content. (The live feeds on the OTT subscription channels consist of the primary channel's East and West Coast feeds and, for Amazon Video customers, the East Coast feeds of its seven multiplex channels.)

Cinemax's operations are based alongside HBO inside WarnerMedia's corporate headquarters at 30 Hudson Yards in Manhattan's West Side district.

History

1980–1989
In an effort to capitalize on the swift national growth that Home Box Office (HBO) had experienced since it began transmitting via satellite in September 1975, Home Box Office, Inc.—then owned by the Time-Life Broadcasting unit of Time Inc.—experimented with a companion pay service to sell to prospective subscribers—including existing HBO customers—with Take 2, a movie-centered premium channel marketed at a family audience that launched on April 1, 1979. The "mini-pay" service (a smaller-scale pay television channel sold at a discounted rate) tried to cater to cable subscribers reluctant to subscribe to HBO because of its cost and potentially objectionable content in some programs. Take 2, however, was hampered by a slow subscriber and carriage growth throughout its just-under-two-year history. By the Spring of 1980, HBO executives began developing plans for a tertiary, lower-cost "maxi-pay" service (a full-service pay channel sold at a premium or slightly lower rate) to better complement HBO. On May 18 of that year, during the 1980 National Cable Television Association Convention, Home Box Office announced that it would launch a companion movie channel, to be named Cinemax. Billed as the cable industry's "first true tier," Cinemax was designed to complement HBO (designated as a higher-tier "foundation [premium] service"), and avoid difficulties associated with bundling multiple "foundation" pay services; it was also intended to act as a direct competitor to The Movie Channel (then owned by Warner-Amex Satellite Entertainment, operated as a joint venture between Warner Bros. Discovery predecessor Warner Communications and American Express), and Home Theater Network (a now-defunct service owned by Group W Satellite Communications, which focused on G- and PG-rated films and was accordingly marketed toward families), maintaining a movie selection format chosen for their appeal to select audience demographics.

Cinemax launched on August 1, 1980, over 56 cable systems in the Eastern and Central Time Zones; a West Coast feed for the Pacific and Mountain Time Zones launched on September 1. Initially airing nightly on an open-ended schedule dependent on the length of the evening's programs (usually from 1:00 p.m. to 12:00 a.m. ET/PT), Cinemax's programming centered on theatrical feature films, emphasized by on-air spokesman Robert Culp, who told viewers that Cinemax would be about movies and nothing but movies. Movie classics were a mainstay of Cinemax at its birth, presented "all uncut and commercial-free" (as Culp said on-air), focusing mainly on movies released between the 1930s and the 1960s, mixed with films from the 1970s and up to eight recent titles per month that were chosen to limit programming duplication with HBO. (At the time, HBO featured a wider range of programming, including some entertainment news interstitials, documentaries, children's programming, sporting events and television specials consisting of Broadway plays, stand-up comedy acts and concerts.)

Cinemax would go on to experience far greater success in its early years than Take 2 (which Time-Life shut down in February 1981). Cable television subscribers typically had access to only about three dozen channels because of limited channel capacity offered at the time by cable headend systems. Partly because of HBO, its national competitors (Showtime and The Movie Channel), and regional pay services in certain markets, customer demand for uncut broadcasts of theatrical movies was also high among cable subscribers at the time; this made Cinemax a palatable offering for cable systems with the necessary space to offer four premium channels and an attractive add-on for HBO subscribers, as it would show classic films without commercial interruptions and editing for time and content. HBO traditionally marketed Cinemax to cable operators for sale to subscribers as part of a singular premium bundle with the former, available at a discount for subscribers that elected to subscribe to both channels. (The typical pricing for a monthly subscription to HBO in the early 1980s was US$12.95 per month, while Cinemax typically could be added for between US$7 and $10 extra per month.) In many areas, cable providers declined to offer Cinemax to customers who did not already have an HBO subscription.

On August 28, 1980, Time-Life announced that Cinemax would transition to a 24-hour, seven-day-a-week programming schedule at the start of 1981. (The Movie Channel was the only national premium service at the time to offer a 24-hour-a-day schedule, doing so on December 1, 1979, following its transition from a timeshare service on Nickelodeon's transponder to operating on a standalone transponder as an independent service.) On January 1, 1981, Cinemax began offering a full 168-hour weekly schedule (except for occasional interruptions for scheduled early-morning technical maintenance), adding programming full-time from 6:00 a.m. to 1:00 p.m. ET/PT. (HBO ran only twelve hours of programming a day from 1:30 p.m. to 1:30 a.m. ET/PT until September 1981, when it adopted a weekend-only, 24-hour schedule that ran from Friday afternoon until late Sunday night/early Monday morning; Cinemax and rival Showtime [on July 4]'s transitions to such a schedule and The Movie Channel's existing 24-hour offerings resulted in HBO going forward with implementing a 24-hour schedule week-round as well on December 28, 1981.)

On October 18, 1983, Tulsa 23 Limited Partnership—then the locally based owners of Tulsa, Oklahoma independent station KOKI-TV (now a Fox affiliate)—filed a federal trademark infringement lawsuit against Home Box Office, Inc. and Time-Life Inc. in the U.S. District Court for the Northern District of Oklahoma; the lawsuit sought $4 million in damages (totaling more than $1 million in personal, and $3 million in exemplary damages) and a permanent injunction against Cinemax's use of "We Are Your Movie Star" as its promotional slogan, which, in similar fashion, had been used by KOKI at the time (billing itself as "The Movie Star" or "Oklahoma's Movie Star" to highlight the nightly movie presentations that the station had been offering since it signed on in October 1980). Attorneys with Tulsa 23, L.P. stated that they had issued a cease and desist request to Home Box Office, Inc., asking it to stop using the Cinemax promotional campaign—which launched nationally on June 9—on August 16. On November 22, 1980, U.S. District Court Judge James O. Ellison ruled in favor of Tulsa 23, issuing a preliminary injunction ordering Cinemax to discontinue the campaign slogan on grounds that it infringed on the KOKI campaign. HBO/Time-Life appealed the lawsuit to the U.S. Court of Appeals for the Tenth Circuit, which on December 5, upheld Ellison's order enjoining Cinemax from continuing to use the slogan.

As additional movie-oriented channels launched on cable television, Cinemax began to change its programming philosophy in order to maintain its subscriber base. First, the channel opted to schedule R-rated movies during daytime slots (HBO would only show R-rated movies during the nighttime hours, after 8:00 p.m. Eastern Time, a policy that network largely continues to adhere to ); Cinemax then decided it could compete by airing more adult-oriented movies that contained nudity and depictions of sexual intercourse, launching the weekly "Friday After Dark" late-night block in 1984 (which also featured the short-lived adult drama Scandals, and a series of anthology specials under the Eros America and Eros International banners). During the network's first decade on the air, Cinemax had also aired some original music programming: during the mid-to-late 1980s, upon the meteoric rise in popularity of MTV, Cinemax began airing music videos in the form of an interstitial that ran during extended breaks between films called MaxTrax; it also ran music specials under the banner Cinemax Sessions as well as the music interview and performance series Album Flash during that same time period.

The mid- and late-1980s also saw the addition of a limited amount of series programming onto Cinemax's schedule including the sketch comedy series Second City Television (whose U.S. broadcast rights were acquired by the channel from NBC in 1983) and the science fiction series The Max Headroom Show (another series, Max Headroom aired on ABC from 1987 to 1988). Comedy specials were also occasionally broadcast on the channel during the late 1980s, under the Cinemax Comedy Experiment banner, featuring free-form sketch and improvisational styles from various rising and established stand-up comics (such as Howie Mandel, Chris Elliott and Eric Bogosian). Although its programming had diversified, Cinemax had foremost remained a movie channel. In February 1988, the network premiere broadcast of the 1987 action-comedy Lethal Weapon became the highest rated telecast in Cinemax's history at that time, averaging a 16.9 rating and 26 share.

1989–2016
On March 4, 1989, Warner Communications announced its intent to merge with HBO parent Time Inc. for $14.9 billion in cash and stock.

By 1990, Cinemax limited its programming lineup mainly to movies. However starting in 1992, Cinemax re-entered into television series development with the addition of adult-oriented scripted series similar in content to the softcore pornographic films featured on the channel in late night (such as the network's first original adult series Erotic Confessions, and later series entries such as Hot Line, Passion Cove, Lingerie and Co-Ed Confidential), marking a return to adult series for the channel.

From 1992 to 1997, Cinemax aired daily movie showcases in set timeslots, centering on a certain genre which differed each day of the week; with the introduction of a new on-air presentation package in 1993, the genre of a given showcase was represented by various pictograms that usually appeared within a specialized feature presentation bumper before the start of the movie; the symbols included: "Comedy" (represented by an abstract face made up of various movie props, with an open mouth made to appear like it is laughing), "Suspense" (represented by a running man silhouette within a jagged film strip), "Premiere" (represented by an exclamation mark immersed in spotlights), "Horror" (represented by a skull augmented with a devil horn and a gear-shaped eye, overlaid in front on a casket), "Drama" (represented by abstract comedy and tragedy masks), "Vanguard" (represented by a globe overlaid on a film strip), "Action" (represented by a machine gun and an explosion) and "Classic" (represented by a classic movie-era couple embracing and kissing). The particular film genre that played on the specific day (and time) varied by country.

In the United States:
 Monday, 8:00 p.m. Eastern Time: Comedy
 Tuesday, 8:00 p.m. Eastern Time: Suspense
 Wednesday (originally Friday), 8:00 p.m. Eastern Time: Vanguard
 Thursday, 8:00 p.m. Eastern Time: Drama (originally Horror)
 Friday (originally Wednesday), 8:00 p.m. Eastern Time: Premiere
 Saturday, 10:00 p.m. (originally 11:30 p.m.) Eastern Time: Action
 Sunday, Noon Eastern Time: Classic

In Latin America:
 Monday: Comedy
 Tuesday: Classic
 Wednesday: Drama
 Thursday: Horror / Suspense
 Friday: Vanguard
 Saturday: Premiere
 Sunday: Action

These genre-based movie presentations ended in September 1997, as part of an extensive rebranding of the network; Cinemax's only themed movie presentations at that point became a nightly featured movie at 8:00 p.m. Eastern Time (under the branding "Max Hits at 8") and a nightly primetime movie at 10:00 p.m. Eastern Time (branded as "Max Prime at 10").

On March 1, 1994, Cinemax, HBO and rivals Showtime and The Movie Channel implemented a cooperative content advisory system to provide to parents specific information about pay-cable programming content that may be unsuitable for their children; the development of the system—inspired by the advisory ratings featured in program guides distributed by the major premium cable services—was in response to concerns from parents and advocacy groups about violent content on television, allowing HBO and other services to assign individual ratings corresponding to the objectionable content depicted in specific programs (and categorized based on violence, profanity, sexuality or miscellaneous mature material) at their discretion. A revised system—centered around ten content codes of two to three letters in length—was implemented across Cinemax and the other participating pay services on June 10, 1994.

Upon the launch of the two multiplex channels in 1998, Cinemax offered "sneak preview" blocks of programs that could be seen on ActionMax and ThrillerMax in primetime, respectively on Saturdays and Sundays. By the mid-2000s, classic films released from the 1940s to the 1970s – which had been a mainstay of the Cinemax schedule from its launch (and continued to air on the main channel in the morning hours during the 1990s and early 2000s) – were relegated to some of its multiplex channels, and became prominent on its multiplex service, 5StarMax. Today, a large majority of mainstream films featured on the main channel are releases from the 1990s to the present, with some films from the 1970s and 1980s included on the schedule.

In 2001, Cinemax began to shift its focus from solely airing second-run feature films that were previously broadcast on sister channel HBO before their Cinemax debut, to premiering select blockbuster and lesser-known theatrical films before their initial broadcast on HBO. In February 2011, Cinemax announced that it would begin offering mainstream original programming to compete with other premium and streaming services, in the form of action-themed series aimed at men in the key demo. These programs were also added in an effort to change the longstanding image of Cinemax as a channel mostly known for carrying softcore pornographic series and movies.

2016–present
On October 22, 2016, AT&T announced an offer to acquire Time Warner for $108.7 billion, including debt it would assume from the latter; the merger would bring Time Warner's various media properties, including HBO and Cinemax, under the same corporate umbrella as AT&T's telecommunications holdings, including satellite provider DirecTV and IPTV/broadband provider AT&T U-verse. Time Warner shareholders approved the merger on February 15, 2017.

On November 20, 2017, the U.S. Department of Justice filed a lawsuit against AT&T and Time Warner in an attempt to block the merger, citing antitrust concerns surrounding the transaction. U.S. clearance of the proposed merger—which had already received approval from European, Mexican, Chilean and Brazilian regulatory authorities—was affirmed by court ruling on June 12, 2018, after District of Columbia U.S. District Court Judge Richard J. Leon ruled in favor of AT&T, and dismissed antitrust claims asserted in the DOJ's lawsuit. The merger closed two days later on June 14, 2018, with Time Warner becoming a wholly owned subsidiary of AT&T, which renamed the unit WarnerMedia; the Home Box Office, Inc. unit and its assets (including Cinemax) were assigned to the newly formed WarnerMedia Entertainment division, although it continues to operate as an autonomous subsidiary. The U.S. Court of Appeals in Washington unanimously upheld the lower court's ruling in favor of AT&T on February 26, 2019. By the time AT&T purchased Time Warner in the spring of 2018, adult programming on both the HBO and Cinemax multiplexes and on-demand services had all but disappeared, a tacit acknowledgement of that content being easily available on the Internet and other companies taking away the advantage of those films airing on premium services.

In January 2020, WarnerMedia executives acknowledged that in light of the company's pending launch of the HBO Max streaming service with its own original programming lineup, Cinemax would no longer be commissioning original programming. However, executives with the company stated that Cinemax would remain available for the foreseeable future as a movie-focused service through its existing distributors, and that Cinemax's original programming (despite being carried by international HBO networks and streaming services outside the United States) would not be included initially in HBO Max. Len Amato, the direct executive in charge of the network and HBO's film/miniseries division, left WarnerMedia on August 14, 2020, ending Cinemax's original programming efforts in full, along with any further attempt to market the network alone.

On May 17, 2021, AT&T and Discovery, Inc. reached a definitive Reverse Morris Trust agreement, in which WarnerMedia would spin out from AT&T as an independent company that in turn will acquire Discovery's assets. The $43-billion cash/securities/stock transaction, which will include the retention of certain existing WarnerMedia debt, is expected to be finalized by the second quarter of 2022. Upon completion, Home Box Office Inc. and all other assets of WarnerMedia would be combined with the Discovery assets (such as Discovery Channel, Animal Planet, Discovery+, Eurosport, Asian Food Network, All3Media, GolfTV, Golf Digest, Golf World, Really, Motor Trend Group, Travel Channel, Discovery Family, TLC, TVN Group, Frisbee, K2, Discovery New Zealand, Tele 5, HGTV, Food Network and many more). AT&T shareholders will own 71% of the company's stock and Discovery shareholders will own the remaining 29% share; Discovery President/CEO David Zaslav will be appointed to head the new company, replacing WarnerMedia CEO Jason Kilar.

International versions

In Latin America, Cinemax was launched on September 5, 1993. It broadcasts classic and recent movies, television series and miniseries. From June 1, 2010, it became an ad-supported basic cable movie channel for the region only. Cinemax's original series aired on the HBO premium suit in the region.

In Asia, Cinemax was launched in 1996. It broadcasts action, comedy, science-fiction, and western movies. It was named Max from 2009 until 2012.

In Central Europe, Cinemax was launched in February 2005 broadcasting mainly festival, indie, European and classics movies. Cinemax and Cinemax 2 are available in Bulgaria, the Czech Republic, Hungary, Poland, Romania and Slovakia. From 2009, these channels are also available in certain Balkan countries. The channels are focused on streaming independent independent movies. Initially Cinemax 2 was a timeshift channel with a time delay of 24 hours, but since 2016 the channel have different schedule.

Channels

Background
In an effort to reduce subscriber churn by offering extra programming choices to subscribers, on May 8, 1991, Home Box Office Inc. announced plans to launch two additional channels of HBO and Cinemax, becoming the first subscription television services to launch "multiplexed" companion channels (a term coined by Michael Fuchs, then-CEO of Home Box Office, Inc., to equate the channel tier to a multi-screen movie theater), each available at no extra charge to subscribers of one or both networks. On August 1, 1991, through a test launch of the three channels over those systems, TeleCable customers in Overland Park, Kansas, Racine, Wisconsin and suburban Dallas (Richardson and Plano, Texas) that subscribed to either service began receiving a secondary channel of Cinemax and/or two additional HBO channels. Cinemax 2, HBO2 and HBO3 (now HBO Signature) each offered distinct schedules of programs culled from HBO and Cinemax's movie and original programming libraries separate from offerings shown concurrently on their respective parent primary channels.

At the time the multiplex test was announced, HBO's then-executive vice president of marketing, John K. Billock, cited internal research that indicated HBO and Cinemax subscribers were prone to cancelling their subscriptions because they either believed that neither tended to have "anything on worth watching" or, when presented with a full monthly schedule, felt that programs they wanted to watch did not air at preferable times. A November 1991 ACNielsen survey of 550 TeleCable subscribers in the three launch markets determined that HBO and Cinemax's multiplex offerings created positive impacts on subscriber usage and attitudes that factored into whether a subscriber elected to cancel their HBO and/or Cinemax service, with declines in negative opinions on pricing (from 30% to 22%) and the perception of too many repeat program showings each month (from 52% to 35%), and increases in overall usage (rising by 11%) and favorability ratings among home media (from 30% to 50%).

In February 1996, in anticipation of the adoption of MPEG-2 digital compression codecs that would allow cable providers to offer digital cable service, Home Box Office, Inc. announced plans to expand its multiplex services across Cinemax and HBO to twelve channels, encompassing a two additional Cinemax channels and fourth HBO channel, originally projected for a Spring 1997 launch. The Cinemax multiplex expanded on December 1, 1996, with the launch of a third channel, Cinemax 3, featuring additional programming from Cinemax's content distributors. (Cinemax 3's launch coincided with the launch of Mountain Time Zone feeds of HBO, HBO2, Cinemax and Cinemax 2, which were the first subfeeds ever offered by a subscription television service to specifically serve that time zone.)

Home Box Office, Inc. began marketing the Cinemax channel suite and related coastal feeds under the umbrella brand "MultiChannel Cinemax" in September 1994; the package was rebranded as "MultiMax," now exclusively classified to the expanded four-channel Cinemax multiplex package (and later applied to the three thematic channels that were launched afterward), in April 1998. (The HBO tier was accordingly marketed as "MultiChannel HBO" and then "HBO The Works" at the respective times.) Concurrent with the adoption of the "MultiMax" package brand, the first major expansion to the multiplex took place with two of the channels changing their names and formats and a fourth genre-based channel being added: Cinemax 2 was rebranded as MoreMax, and Cinemax 3 was relaunched as ActionMax—maintaining a focus on action and adventure films. A fourth channel, ThrillerMax, also launched, focusing on mystery, suspense and horror films.

Four additional themed channels were launched on May 17, 2001: OuterMax (which carried films dealing with the science fiction, horror and fantasy genres), WMax (films with women), @Max (films for a younger adult audience) and 5StarMax (focusing on critically acclaimed and classic feature films). On June 1, 2013, WMax and @Max were respectively relaunched as MovieMax and Max Latino. Max Latino – which dropped its distinct branding and was renamed Cinemáx on April 1, 2015 – mirrors the schedule of the flagship Cinemax channel (similar to the format of HBO Latino, which simulcasts most of the HBO schedule except for certain differing programs), featuring Spanish-language dubs of feature films and original series broadcast by the main channel. MovieMax started out as a family-oriented channel which did not broadcast R-rated films, and focuses on recent and classic hit movies.

List of channels

Depending on the service provider, Cinemax provides up to eight 24-hour multiplex channels—all of which are simulcast in both standard definition and high definition, and available as time zone-based regional feeds—as well as a subscription video-on-demand service (Cinemax on Demand). Off-the-air maintenance periods of anywhere from a half-hour up to two hours occur at varied overnight/early morning time slots (usually preceding the 6:00 a.m. ET/PT start of the defined broadcast day) once per month on each channel.

Cinemax transmits feeds of its primary and multiplex channels on both Eastern and Pacific Time Zone schedules. The respective coastal feeds of each channel are usually packaged together, resulting in the difference in local airtimes for a particular movie or program between two geographic locations being three hours at most; the opposite-region feed (i.e., the Pacific Time feeds in the Eastern and Central Time Zones, and the Eastern Time feeds in the Pacific, Mountain and Alaska Time Zones) serves as a timeshift channel, allowing viewers who may have missed a particular program at its original local airtime to watch it three hours after its initial airing or allowing them to watch a program up to four hours, depending on the applicable time zone, in advance of their local airtime on their corresponding primary coastal feed. (Most cable, satellite and IPTV providers as well as its Apple TV, Amazon Prime Video and Roku OTT channels only offer the East and West Coast feeds of the main Cinemax channel; some conventional television providers may include coastal feeds of MoreMax in certain areas, while wider availability of coastal feeds for the other five multiplex channels is limited to subscribers of DirecTV, YouTube TV and the Hulu live TV service.)

Other services

Cinemax HD
Cinemax HD is a high definition simulcast feed of Cinemax that broadcasts in 1080i resolution and Dolby Digital 5.1 sound. Cinemax maintains high definition simulcast feeds of its main channel and all seven multiplex channels. From the 2008 rollout of HD simulcasts for the Cinemax multiplex feeds until the mid-2010s, the majority of pay television providers that carried Cinemax HD generally offered only the main channel in high definition, with HD carriage of the multiplex channels varying by market. , most providers transmit all eight Cinemax multiplex channels in HD, either on a dedicated HD channel tier separate from their SD assignments or as hybrid SD/HD feeds.The flagship network began transmitting its programming exclusively in high definition on September 1, 2008.

Cinemax On Demand
Cinemax On Demand is Cinemax's companion subscription video-on-demand (SVOD) service that is available at no additional cost to subscribers of the linear television service. VOD content from the network is also available on select virtual MVPD services, including DirecTV Stream, and Hulu, and through Cinemax's dedicated OTT video channels on Apple TV Channels, Amazon Video Channels, and The Roku Channel. The service launched in 2002.

Cinemax Go

Cinemax Go (formerly MAX Go) was a former TV Everywhere streaming service for subscribers of the linear Cinemax television service. It was accessible as a desktop website through and through apps for Apple and Google Play devices, along with most digital media players and game consoles; mobile device apps were discontinued in the years before the Go service was shut down. Content available on Max Go was outside a few contractual exceptions, mirrored the selection of Cinemax On Demand. Like HBO, live simulcasts of the seven linear Cinemax channels were not a part of the service, though it offered new episodes of the network's original programming at the exact time of its wireline release.

The service launched on September 13, 2010. It is available to Cinemax subscribers of AT&T U-verse, Cox Communications, DirecTV, Dish Network, Suddenlink Communications, and Charter Communications. The Max GO iPhone, iPad, and Android app was released on August 11, 2011. The MAX Go app was discontinued on April 30, 2020, on all mobile and TV platforms to drive viewership for HBO Max. The service's desktop website (since renamed Cinemax Go to avoid confusion with HBO Max) continued to operate until it was discontinued on July 31, 2022, as part of new network owner Warner Bros. Discovery's efforts to build a united streaming presence around HBO Max.

Programming

Movies
On average, movies occupy between 20 and 24 hours of the daily schedule on Cinemax and MoreMax, and 24 hours per day on its six thematic multiplex channels. Since June 2000, Cinemax has offered weekly pay television premieres of recent theatrical and original made-for-cable movies every Sunday at 8:00 p.m. ET/PT. Until May 2008, the premiere presentations were marketed as "See It Saturday," later renamed "See It Sunday" after the network moved its premiere night to Sundays in January 2002. Before settling on Sundays as its anchor premiere night, Cinemax's prime time film premieres varied in scheduling between Friday, Saturday and Wednesday, depending on network preference. First-run theatrical films debut on average from ten months to one year after the conclusion of their initial theatrical run, and no more than six months after their DVD or digital VOD download release.

 Cinemax and sister channel HBO maintain exclusive licensing agreements to first-run and library film content from the following movie studios and related subsidiaries:
 Warner Bros. Pictures Group (since January 1987);
 Subsidiaries: New Line Cinema (since January 2005), Warner Animation Group (since January 2014), DC Films (since May 2017), and Castle Rock Entertainment (since January 2003);
 Library content: Warner Independent Pictures (2003–2008 releases);
 20th Century Studios (exclusive since January 1989 (select titles since November 2021); non-exclusive, 1986–1988 (select titles since November 2021));
 Subsidiaries: 20th Century Animation (since May 1998), 20th Century Family (since January 2018), New Regency Productions (since January 1995, as an independent studio) and Searchlight Pictures (since January 1995);
 Library content: Fox Atomic (2007–2009 releases), Blue Sky Studios (2003–2020 releases, studio now defunct) and Fox 2000 Pictures (1998–2020 releases);
 Universal Pictures (exclusive since January 2003; non-exclusive, 1984–1990);
 Subsidiaries: Universal Animation Studios (since January 2007), DreamWorks Animation (co-productions; since January 2011), Working Title Films (since January 2003), Illumination Entertainment (since January 2011) and Focus Features (since May 2003);
 Library content: Savoy Pictures (1993–1997 releases) and Gramercy Pictures (1992–2001 and 2015–2016 releases);
 Summit Entertainment (since January 2013)
 Library content: Lions Gate Entertainment (parent company; releases dating to 1997), Grindstone Entertainment Group (releases dating to 2005), Pantelion Films (releases dating to 2010), Mandate Pictures (2001–2013 releases), Artisan Entertainment (1992–2004 releases), Codeblack Films (releases dating to 2005), Mandalay Pictures (releases dating to 1995), Anchor Bay Entertainment (2006–2017 releases), Maple Pictures (2005–2011 releases), Prism Pictures (1984–1996 releases) and Trimark Pictures (1989–2001 releases)

Cinemax also maintains sub-run agreements—covering television and streaming licensing of films that have previously received broadcast or syndicated television airings—for theatrical films distributed by Paramount Pictures (including content from subsidiaries and/or acquired library partners The Cannon Group, Carolco Pictures, Republic Pictures and Miramax, all for films released prior to 2011; although the studio is covered in the HBO contract, Nickelodeon Movies films typically do not air on Cinemax), Walt Disney Studios Motion Pictures (including content from Walt Disney Pictures, and former subsidiaries Touchstone Pictures and Hollywood Pictures; films released through or by their other divisions like Pixar, Marvel Studios, and Lucasfilm were not covered by the HBO/Cinemax joint contract, restricted to the channels that Disney owns, as well as Flix and streaming/digital platforms instead), Sony Pictures Entertainment (including content from subsidiaries/library partners Columbia Pictures, Sony Pictures Classics, ELP Communications, Morgan Creek Entertainment, Screen Gems, Revolution Studios, and former HBO sister company TriStar Pictures, all for films released prior to 2005; films from Sony Pictures Animation and Stage 6 Films are not covered under Cinemax's programming rights with Sony due to an existing agreement with Sony Movie Channel), and Metro-Goldwyn-Mayer (including content from subsidiaries United Artists, Orion Pictures and The Samuel Goldwyn Company).

Films to which HBO maintains traditional telecast and streaming rights will usually also be shown on the Cinemax television and streaming platforms during their licensing agreement period (either after a film title completes its HBO window or transfers between services over certain months during the contractual period). Feature films from the aforementioned studios that maintain joint licensing contracts encompassing both services will typically make their premium television debut on HBO approximately two to three months before their premiere on Cinemax and vice versa. Cinemax rarely airs G-rated films during the morning hours, instead opting to air films with R, PG-13 or PG ratings during these time slots. The channel also produces documentary films under the banner Cinemax Reel Life.

Background
HBO/Cinemax's relationship with Warner Bros. began with a five-year distribution agreement signed in June 1986, encompassing films released between January 1987 and December 1992; the estimated cost of the initial pay-cable rights were between $300 million and $600 million, depending on the overall performance of Warner's films and HBO/Cinemax's respective subscriber counts. Although the Warner deal was initially non-exclusive, a preemptive strategy in the event that its co-owned rivals Showtime and The Movie Channel (which elected not to pick up any spare Warner titles) sought full exclusivity over movie rights, the terms gave Warner an option to require HBO to acquire exclusive rights to titles covered under the remainder of the deal for $60 million per year (in addition to a guaranteed $65-million fee for each year of the contract). As a result of the 1989 Time-Warner merger, HBO and Cinemax hold pay-cable exclusivity over all newer Warner Bros. films for the duration of their joint ownership.

20th Century Fox first signed a non-exclusive deal with HBO and Cinemax in January 1986, covering Fox films released between 1985 and 1988, along with a production co-financing agreement involving HBO original programs; the pact transitioned to an exclusivity arrangement with the 1988 renewal. The first-run film output agreement with Fox was renewed by HBO for ten years on August 15, 2012 (with a provision allowing the studio to release its films through digital platforms such as iTunes and Amazon Video during the channel's term of license of an acquired film for the first time). While The Walt Disney Company completed its acquisition of 20th Century Fox in March 2019, Disney maintains an output deal with its in-house streaming services Disney+ and Hulu for films produced and/or distributed by Walt Disney Studios Motion Pictures and its subsidiaries (which have not distributed their films over a traditional pay-cable service since the studio's agreement with HBO rival Starz ended in 2015). Disney continued to honor the output deal with HBO until November 2021, when WarnerMedia and Disney announced that the deal would be expanded to the end of 2022, with an amendment that will allow half of 20th Century Studios' 2022 slate to be shared between HBO/HBO Max and Disney+ or Hulu during the pay-one window, beginning with Ron's Gone Wrong.

HBO/Cinemax's relationship with Universal first began in March 1984, when it signed a six-year non-exclusivity deal with the studio; in April 1990, Universal elected to sign a deal with CBS for the licensing rights to a package of the studio's ten 1989 releases, bypassing the traditional pay-cable window. The current Universal output deal—which began as an eight-year agreement that originally lasted through December 2010, assuming the studio's pay-cable rights from Starz—was renewed for ten years on January 6, 2013; the current deal gives HBO right of first refusal over select Universal titles, allowing the studio to exercise an option to license co-distributed live-action films to Showtime and animated films to Netflix if HBO elects not to obtain pay television rights to a particular film. (Universal put a 50% cap on title acquisitions for the first year of the initial 2003–10 contract, intending to split the rights between HBO and Starz as consolation for the latter outbidding HBO for Sony Pictures output deal.) On July 6, 2021, Universal Filmed Entertainment Group announced it would begin releasing its theatrical films on Peacock after its exclusivity agreement with HBO concludes at the end of 2021, under a fragmented window (starting within 120 days of a film's theatrical release) through which Peacock will hold exclusive rights to Universal titles in bookending four-month windows at the beginning and end of the 18-month pay-one distribution period. Subsequently, Amazon (on July 8) and Starz (on July 16) signed separate multi-year sub-licensing agreements, in which Universal films would stream on Prime Video and IMDb TV in a 10-month non-exclusivity window during the middle of the period and air on Starz's linear and streaming platforms following the Peacock/Amazon windows; HBO will continue to release Universal's 2021 film slate under their existing contracts through 2022, while Netflix will continue to offer the studio's animated films thereafter.

The first-run output deal with Summit Entertainment—which initially ran through December 2017, and replaced Showtime (which had exclusive rights to its films from January 2008 until December 2012) as the studio's pay-cable output partner when it initially went into effect in 2013—was renewed by HBO for an additional four years on March 1, 2016. (Summit is currently the only "mini-major" movie studio and the only studio not among the five core majors that maintains an exclusive output deal with HBO.) On March 2, 2021, Summit owner Lionsgate announced that the Summit output deal would move to Starz at the end of 2022.

Former first-run contracts
Upon the network's launch, Cinemax offered theatrical films from Columbia Pictures, under a four-year exclusive deal with HBO signed in June 1976 for a package of 20 films released between January 1977 and January 1981, in exchange for then-parent company Time, Inc. committing a $5-million production financing investment with Columbia over a period of between 12 and 18 months. Although HBO executives were reluctant at first to strike such arrangements, by the mid-1980s, the channel had transitioned to exclusive film output deals (now the standard among North American premium channels), in which a film studio licenses all or a proportion of their upcoming productions to a partner service over a multi-year contract. In 1983, HBO entered into three exclusive licensing agreements tied to production financing arrangements involving Tri-Star Pictures (formed as a co-production venture between Time, Inc./HBO, Columbia and CBS Inc.), Columbia Pictures (an exclusivity-based contract extension initially covering 50% of the studio's pre-June 1986 releases with a non-compete option to purchase additional Columbia titles) and Orion Pictures (encompassing a package of 30 films, in return for financial participation and a $10-million securities investment; the deal was indirectly associated with Orion's buyout of Filmways the year prior, in which HBO bought pay television rights to the studio's films). All three deals were approved under a U.S. Department of Justice review greenlighting the Tri-Star venture in June of that year. (The Tri-Star deal became non-exclusive in January 1988, although Showtime elected not to acquire titles from HBO's film rights lessees.) After the exclusive contract transferred to Showtime in January 1994, in July 1995, HBO/Cinemax preemptively signed a five-year deal with the studio that took effect in January 2000, in conjunction with a five-year extension of its existing deal with Columbia Pictures.

In early 1984, HBO/Cinemax abandoned the practice of acquiring the exclusive pay-cable rights to theatrical feature films, citing internal research that concluded that subscribers showed indifference to efforts by premium channels to secure rights to studios' full slate of recently released films from to distinguish their programming due to VHS availability preceding pay-cable distribution in the release window. This change came after Frank Biondi was fired as HBO Chairman, reportedly for having "overextended the network in pre-buy and exclusive movie deals" as subscribership of pay-cable services declined. Biondi's replacement, Michael J. Fuchs, structured some of the subsequent deals as non-exclusive to allow HBO to divert more funding toward co-producing made-for-cable movies, other original programming and theatrical joint ventures (via Tri-Star and Silver Screen Partners).

In September 1986, HBO/Cinemax signed a five-year agreement with MGM/UA Communications Co. for a package of up to 72 Metro-Goldwyn-Mayer and United Artists films. In July 1987, HBO/Cinemax signed a five-year, $500-million deal for exclusive rights to 85 Paramount Pictures films to have been tentatively released between May 1988 and May 1993. (This solidified an existing alliance with Paramount dating to 1979, for the non-exclusive rights to the studio's films.) Though this contract would herald the end of its embargo on new film exclusivity deals, HBO's then-CEO Michael Fuchs cited Showtime–The Movie Channel parent Viacom (which, at the time, had debt in excess of $2.4 billion) for it having to obtain exclusivity for the Paramount package, which the studio approached HBO directly to bid. The Paramount package remained with HBO/Cinemax until December 1997; Showtime assumed the pay-cable rights to the studio's films in January 1998, under a seven-year deal reached as a byproduct of Viacom's 1994 purchase of Paramount from Paramount Communications, and held them until December 2008. (Shared rival Epix—created as a consortium between Paramount/Viacom, Lionsgate and now-sole owner MGM—took over pay television rights upon that network's October 2009 launch.)

In March 1995, HBO/Cinemax signed a ten-year deal with the then-upstart DreamWorks SKG valued at between $600 million and $1 billion, depending on the total output of films and generated revenue during the contract, covering the studio's tentative releases between January 1996 and December 2006. By result of the 2004 spin-off of its animation arm DreamWorks Animation into a standalone company, DreamWorks' pay-cable distribution rights were split up into separate contracts: in March 2010, Showtime acquired the rights to live-action films from the original DreamWorks studio (coinciding with the transfer of co-production agreement from Paramount Pictures to Touchstone Pictures, then a Showtime distribution partner) for five years, effective January 2011. Then in September 2011, after HBO/Cinemax agreed to waive the last two years of its contract, Netflix acquired the DreamWorks Animation contract effective upon the December 2012 expiration of the HBO deal. (Prior to the 2015 launch of HBO Now, HBO required its studio output partners to suspend digital sales of their movies during their exclusive contractual window with the network; the Netflix deal was not subject to any distribution restrictions, allowing DreamWorks Animation to continue the re-sale of its films through digital download via third-party providers.)

Other film studios which formerly maintained first-run pay-cable contracts with Cinemax have included Walt Disney Productions (non-exclusive, 1978–1982), The Samuel Goldwyn Company (non-exclusive, 1979–1986), ITC Entertainment (non-exclusive, 1982–1990), New World Pictures (non-exclusive, 1982–1986), PolyGram Filmed Entertainment (non-exclusive, 1984–1989), Hemdale Film Corporation (non-exclusive, 1982–1986; exclusive, 1987–1991) De Laurentiis Entertainment Group (non-exclusive, 1988–1991) Lorimar Motion Pictures (non-exclusive, 1987–1990), Hemdale Film Corporation (non-exclusive, 1982–1986), Troma Entertainment (exclusive, 1991–1999), Savoy Pictures (exclusive, 1992–1997). and New City Releasing (non-exclusive, 1994–2000).

Original programming

Mainstream action programming
On August 12, 2011, Cinemax began airing original series other than the licensed Max After Dark programming, with the addition of prime time action-oriented series targeted at men between 18 and 49 years of age. On that date, Cinemax debuted its first mainstream original program, the U.S. premiere of the British action series Strike Back (first-run episodes of the series aired by Cinemax during its 2011 season were from the show's second season). The series originally debuted in 2010 on Sky One in the United Kingdom, which HBO and Cinemax partnered with to produce the series after the conclusion of its first season. On October 19, 2012, Cinemax launched its second primetime original series, Hunted, in cooperation with BBC One. Alan Ball's Banshee followed in 2013. Two new shows premiered in 2014: the Steve Kronish-produced Sandbox and Steven Soderbergh-produced The Knick.

In 2020, it was announced that Cinemax would no longer commission original programming, in order to focus on HBO Max. The martial arts drama Warrior was the last remaining original program on Cinemax, and it was announced in April 2021 that its upcoming third season would move to HBO Max.

Former program blocks
 Drive-In Saturday Night – Running Saturday nights at 10:00 p.m. Eastern Time from 1984 to 1993 (competing against a similar block, "Joe Bob's Drive-In Theater" on The Movie Channel, during that period), the "Drive-In Saturday Night" block featured a broad mix of cult films and action movies.
 Cinemax Comic Relief – This film block ran in varied timeslots from 1985 to 1988, showcasing a selection of four or five different comedy films each month.
 Cinemax Comedy Experiment – Running from February 16, 1985, to 1988, the "Cinemax Comedy Experiment" was a showcase of original comedy specials that were more free-form in style (some featuring elements of the sketch comedy and improv genre) than the conventional stand-up format (such as the first special under the banner, Howie Mandel: Live at Carnegie Mall).
 Rising Star – This film block ran in varied timeslots from 1985 to 1986, showcasing feature films from up-and-coming actors.
 Cinemax Film Discovery – This film block ran in varied primetime timeslots from 1985 to 1990, showcasing feature films not previously seen on television or in wide theatrical release.
 Military Max – Running from 1985 to 1988, this showcase featured a mix of four or five different military-themed feature films (most commonly war films, although with occasional broadcasts of military-themed films of other genres).
 Cinemax Director's Chair – This film block ran in varied timeslots from 1985 to 1993, showcasing a selection of notable films from an acclaimed director.
 Beyond the Screen - This in-between bumper shows behind the scene looks of an upcoming movie or a movie that will soon be aired on Cinemax.
 Cinemax Western Roundup – Running from 1985 to 1993, this weekend block featured a mix of film westerns.
 Cinemania – This film block ran in varied timeslots from 1988 to 1993, showcasing a selection of comedic films.
 Cinemax Classic Collection – Running from 1985 to 1993, this block showcased a selection of film classics from the 1930s to the 1960s.
 Cinemax From the Heart – This film block ran in varied timeslots from 1988 to 1993, showcasing a selection of romantic comedies and dramas.
 Vanguard Cinema – This film block ran in varied timeslots from 1988 to 1993, showcasing a selection of critically acclaimed films from the United States and abroad (the block was divided into three sub-blocks: "Cinemax Documentary", featuring first-run documentary films; "New Wave Films", featuring acclaimed recent movies; and "Cinemax Imports", originally a standalone block that began in 1985, which showcased film releases from other countries).
 Max Crime Time – This film block ran in varied timeslots from 1988 to 1997, showcasing a selection of crime dramas, detective films or film noirs.
 Starring... – This film block ran in varied timeslots from 1988 to 1997, showcasing a selection of hits as well as some early films from a particular film actor throughout the month.
 Summer of 1000 Movies – "The Summer of 1000 Movies" annual film festival ran from 1992 to 2005, and ran until the mid-2000s, in which the channel ran 1,000 films (many with a similar subject) over the course of each summer without repeats.
 Max Hits at 8 – Running from 1997 to 2001, this block showcased a popular feature film each night at 8:00 p.m. Eastern Time.
 Max Prime at 10/Max Time – Debuting in 1997 under the "Max Prime" banner, this block showcased a particular choice movie of various genres each night at 10:00 p.m. Eastern Time (or on weeknights only between 1998 and 2000, as a result of the creation of the "ActionMax on Cinemax" and "ThrillerMax on Cinemax" blocks).

Max After Dark
A signature feature of Cinemax was a late-night block known as Max After Dark, which featured softcore pornographic films and original series. Cinemax did not have set start or end times for the block, as they varied depending on the mainstream feature films – and original series on certain nights – that aired prior to and following it, and also depended on the number of programs and programs in particular that were scheduled to air within the block. Programs that aired under the Max After Dark banner carried either a TV-MA or R rating (usually the former), primarily for strong sexual content and nudity. The block had often been the subject of both scrutiny in the media and a source of humor in popular culture, with references to Cinemax's late night programming being featured in various films and television shows. Because of the block's presence, Cinemax was most commonly given the jocular nickname "Skinemax". The network itself had acknowledged this by using a play on this term for its 2011 documentary series, Skin to the Max.

The late night adult series that aired first-run episodes were Lingerie, Life on Top, Femme Fatales, Zane's The Jump Off, Working Girls in Bed, and Topless Prophet (which debuted on May 30, 2014, as the network's first reality series and followed the world of exotic dancing in Detroit, Michigan). Adult films often aired alongside these series, though this depended on the Cinemax multiplex channel and sometimes depending on that night's Max After Dark schedule on each channel. The block originally debuted on May 4, 1984, as a weekly block called "Cinemax Friday After Dark"; these adult programs eventually expanded to seven-night-a-week airings by the late 1990s. Cinemax maintained an on-air policy – that had been in effect since 1993 – not to air any adult programming on its main channel before 11:30 p.m. ET.

The adult programming featured on Max After Dark was not limited solely to the main Cinemax channel: MoreMax also aired softcore pornographic films and series, sometimes airing earlier (10:30 p.m. Eastern Time at the earliest) than the main Cinemax channel would allow; ActionMax, ThrillerMax and OuterMax also featured adult films on their late night schedules, even though the softcore adult films and series did not necessarily fit the respective formats of these multiplex services. Conversely, MovieMax (which is aimed at families) and 5StarMax (which carries a format of largely critically acclaimed, mainstream feature films) generally do not run any adult programs because of their respective programming formats. Some of the adult films featured on the Max After Dark block also aired late nights on sister channel HBO Zone, which was the only HBO multiplex channel to feature pornographic film content. Cinemax was able to carry softcore pornographic programs as well as other forms of adult content within the channel's mainstream programming in part since the FCC's content regulations applied only to channels that broadcast on the publicly owned spectrum and not those only available on restricted-access cable networks, which had consequently taken considerably more leeway in their programming.

By 2013, Cinemax had begun to scale back on the Max After Dark content, with network executives wanting the service to focus more on its original programming as a point of differentiation. Variety noted the ubiquity of internet porn, and that by modern standards, the softcore content was now relatively tame in comparison to the content seen in original series on HBO and other premium television services.

References

Notes

External links
 

 
Home Box Office, Inc.
Warner Bros. Discovery networks
Commercial-free television networks in the United States
Movie channels in the United States
English-language television stations in the United States
Entertainment companies based in New York City
Peabody Award winners
Television channels and stations established in 1980
Television channels in North Macedonia
Television networks in the United States
1980 establishments in New York City